Brahm Mohindra (born 28 April 1946) is a politician from the state of Punjab, India. He is currently Minister of Local Government, Parliamentary Affairs, Elections, and Removal of Grievances; and is ranked second in order of precedence among ministers, after the Chief Minister.

Education
Sh. Brahm Mohindra completed his graduation in the year 1968 from Government Mohindra College, Patiala.

Background
Brahm Mohindra is the son of Mela Ram and Leelawati Mohindra of the Sood community. Though born in Doraha in Ludhiana district, Brahm Mohindra studied in Patiala, and his entire political career has revolved around Patiala district, where he has represented the rural Patiala constituency for the Indian National Congress.

Political career

Brahm Mohindra is associated with Indian National Congress. He has been elected to the Punjab Legislative Assembly six times(1980,1985,1992, 2007, 2012,and 2017), and he has lost twice.

References

External links
 http://punjab.gov.in/health-family-welfare
 http://punjab.gov.in/council-of-ministers
 https://www.facebook.com/BrahmMohindra/?ref=settings

External links
 http://myneta.info/punjab2017/candidate.php?candidate_id=275
 http://www.yespunjab.com/info4u/item/110888-brahm-mohindra-congress-candidate-patial-rural-profile

Indian National Congress politicians from Punjab, India
State cabinet ministers of Punjab, India
Living people
People from Patiala district
1946 births